Kookne is a prehistoric bird genus from the Late Cretaceous. Known from a coracoid, the remains of the only known species Kookne yeutensis were found in rocks from the Late Cretaceous (Maastrichtian) Chorrillo Formation of Santa Cruz, Argentina.

References

Prehistoric birds of South America